Tetrapturus is a genus of marlins commonly called spearfish, found in tropical and subtropical oceans throughout the world. Some are popular sport fish in big-game fishing.

Species
There are currently four recognized species in this genus:
 Tetrapturus angustirostris S. Tanaka (I), 1915 (Shortbill spearfish)
 Tetrapturus belone Rafinesque, 1810 (Mediterranean spearfish)
 Tetrapturus georgii R. T. Lowe, 1841 (Roundscale spearfish)
 Tetrapturus pfluegeri C. R. Robins & de Sylva, 1963 (Longbill spearfish)

References

 

 
Marine fish genera
Taxa named by Constantine Samuel Rafinesque